CRZ1, short for Calcineurin-Responsive Zinc Finger 1, is a transcription factor that regulates calcineurin dependent-genes in Candida albicans.

Mechanism of action 
The cytoplasmic protein Crz1 is dephosphorylated by the calcineurin and is then targeted to the nucleus. The nuclear protein activates the transcription of genes involved in cell-wall maintenance and ion homeostasis.

Structure 
The protein Crz1 possesses a Zinc-Finger motif that binds to a specific motif called CDRE (Calcineurin-Dependent Response Element) present on the promoter of the targeted genes. It also possesses a nuclear localization signal (NLS) at the N-terminal part

References 

Transcription factors